Guggenheim Foundation or Guggenheim Fund may refer to:

 Daniel Guggenheim Fund for the Promotion of Aeronautics (1926–1930), which awarded grants to establish schools and research centers of aeronautics
 Daniel and Florence Guggenheim Foundation (1924–2011), which awarded grants in aviation and rocketry and, after 1972, in criminal justice
 Harry Frank Guggenheim Foundation, which supports scholarly research on violence
 John Simon Guggenheim Memorial Foundation, which awards grants (Guggenheim Fellowships) to scientists, scholars and artists
 Solomon R. Guggenheim Foundation, which funds the Guggenheim Museums